Xironogiton is a genus of annelids belonging to the family Branchiobdellidae.

The species of this genus are found in Europe and Northern America.

Species:

Xironogiton cassiensis 
Xironogiton fordi 
Xironogiton instabilius 
Xironogiton kittitasi 
Xironogiton occidentalis 
Xironogiton victoriensis

References

Annelids